The North Wirral Coastal Park, on the Wirral Peninsula, England is a coastal park including public open space, common land, natural foreshore and sand-dunes. The park lies between Dove Point in Meols, and the Kings Parade in New Brighton, and was created in 1986.

The park is managed by the Metropolitan Borough of Wirral ranger service from their offices in the Leasowe Lighthouse, and occupies some 400 acres (988 hectares) of land in a four-mile stretch along the coastline making it Wirral's largest park.

Although the park in its current form is relatively new, the history of the site goes back at least 5000 years to when the area, including the foreshore, was heavily forested. The remains of this coastal forestland are known as the 'submerged forest' and can be seen at Dove Point, Meols, between the slipway and the groyne.

Leisure pursuits

Wildlife

The park, which has been granted triple-SI (Site of Special Scientific Interest (SSSI)) status, is one of the country's premier sites for wading bird populations. Among the species which can be found in the area are: Eurasian oystercatcher, common redshank, dunlin, sanderling, ruddy turnstone, northern lapwing, bar-tailed godwit and Eurasian curlew. The large population of fish, worms and crustaceans in the foreshore region sustains the bird wildlife. Among these are to be found: shore crabs, shrimps, prawns, lugworm, ragworm, cockles, tellin, peppery furrow shell, gobies, blennies, sole, plaice, flounder, dab and pipefish.

Sports
The park is a popular site for sailing, angling, swimming, cycling, picnicking, walking, jogging, ball games, bird watching and horse riding.

References

External links

Wirral Metropolitan Borough Council: North Wirral Coastal Park
Wirral Metropolitan Borough Council: Leasowe Lighthouse

Parks and commons in the Metropolitan Borough of Wirral
Sites of Special Scientific Interest in Merseyside
Ramsar sites in England
Beaches of Merseyside